The St. Luke Baptist Church (also known as the St. Luke Missionary Baptist Church) is a historic site in Marianna, Florida. It is located at 4476 East Jackson Street. On February 12, 2003, it was added to the U.S. National Register of Historic Places.

References

External links
Historical Marker Database

Baptist churches in Florida
Gothic Revival church buildings in Florida
Buildings and structures in Jackson County, Florida
Churches on the National Register of Historic Places in Florida
National Register of Historic Places in Jackson County, Florida
1921 establishments in Florida
Churches completed in 1921